Jānis Mendriks (21 January 1907 – 1 August 1953) was a Latvian Catholic priest killed in the Vorkuta Uprising in the Soviet Gulags.

Biography 

Mendriks was born in Logocki, Kalupe Parish, in southern Latgale (then in Russian Empire). He attended Riga Seminary (Rīgas Katoļu garīgais seminārs) after which he was ordained a priest at St. James's Cathedral, Riga on 3 April 1938. He was a member of the Congregation of Marian Fathers. After his ordination, he served as a vicar at the Marian parish in Viļāni.

In 1942, while he served a parish in Ostron, a German policeman died.  He knew the man to be impenitent, and denied him burial in hallowed ground.  This refusal required him to hide from German occupation authorities.

After the Soviet re-occupation of Latvia in 1944, he resumed parish work. He was arrested on 25 October 1950 and sent to prison in Riga. On 24 March 1951 he was sentenced to 10 years of forced labor for "organizing anti-Soviet nationalist gangs and for anti-Soviet propaganda." He was deported to the Komi Republic and worked at a coal mine in the Vorkuta Gulag. Mendriks secretly fulfilled his priestly duties in the labour camp.

Death 
On 19 July 1953 Inmates at Vorkuta who were forced to work in the region's coal mines went on strike during the Vorkuta uprising. The mostly passive strike was put down on 1 August when Red Army troops were ordered by the Vorkuta Gulag camp chief Derevyanko to fire at the strikers, resulting in the deaths of at least 53 prisoners. While the workers of Vorkuta were protesting and rioting Mendriks decided to move to the front row of the prisoners, Mendriks believed that as a priest he should be where the people were dying to prepare them to meet God, Mendriks started reciting the formula of absolution: "Misereatur vestri Omnipotens Deus" in the front row and was shot to death by a Red Army soldier.

Mendriks has been honoured by the Roman Catholic Church as a Servant of God since 2003.

References

Sources 
Biography from the Website of the Marianists

External links 
Servant of God Fr. Janis Mendriks MIC 1907–1953
 Servant of God Janis Mendriks: Priest and martyr

Congregation of Marian Fathers of the Immaculate Conception
1907 births
1953 deaths
Latvian Roman Catholics
Servants of God
Latvian people executed by the Soviet Union
People from Daugavpils Municipality
Catholic people executed by the Soviet Union
Participants in the Vorkuta uprising